Rihon Daimary (born 1 January 1960) in Udalguri, Assam is an Indian politician from the state of Assam. He is a member of the Assam Legislative Assembly from the Bodoland People's Front. He became a minister in the Sarbananda Sonowal-led government in 2016. He has been elected for the fourth time from the Udalguri constituency.

References 

1960 births
Living people
Bodoland People's Front politicians
State cabinet ministers of Assam
Assam MLAs 2016–2021
Members of the Assam Legislative Assembly
People from Udalguri district